Myrica faya (firetree, faya or haya; syn. Morella faya (Ait.) Wilbur) is a species of Myrica, native to Macaronesia (the Azores, Madeira, and the Canary Islands), and possibly also western coastal mainland Portugal.

Description

It easily grows in any type of soil.

It is subdioecious, with the male and female flowers produced largely on separate plants, but often with a few flowers of the other sex present (Binggeli 1997). The male flowers have four stamens and are normally produced in clumps close to the branch. The female flowers, usually occurring in similar groups grow slightly farther from the branch tips. The fruit is an edible drupe  diameter, it is a reddish purple ripening dark purple to black. It is used as an astringent remedy for catarrh (Pérez 1999, Rushforth 1999).

Distribution
In Macaronesian islands it occurs most abundantly at altitudes of 600–900 m. The population in Continental Portugal may be native or naturalised following early importation from Madeira or the Azores (Rushforth 1999). It is an invasive species in Hawaii (Vitousek et al. 1987), where it displaces native trees such as Metrosideros polymorpha, with profound impacts on nitrogen cycling (Vitousek & Walker 1989).

References

Binggeli, P. (1997). Myrica faya. University of Bangor.
Pérez, M. Á. C. (1999). Native Flora of the Canary Islands. .
Rushforth, K. D. (1999). Trees of Britain and Europe. .

Flora Europaea: Myrica faya
University of Hawaii: Myrica faya native habitats
University of Hawaii: Myrica faya as an invasive species in Hawaii

faya
Flora of the Azores
Flora of Madeira
Flora of the Canary Islands
Trees of Africa
Trees of Europe
Least concern plants
Least concern biota of Africa
Least concern biota of Europe
Taxobox binomials not recognized by IUCN